This is a list of 109 species in Anthicus, a genus of antlike flower beetles in the family Anthicidae.

Anthicus species

 Anthicus ancilla Casey, 1895 i c g
 Anthicus angustatus Curtis, 1838 g
 Anthicus antherinus (Linnaeus, 1761) g
 Anthicus antilleorum Werner, 1983 i c g
 Anthicus antiochensis Werner, 1975 i c g
 Anthicus armatus Truqui, 1855 g
 Anthicus ater (Panzer, 1796) g
 Anthicus axillaris Schmidt, 1842 g
 Anthicus balachanus Pic, 1906 g
 Anthicus barbatus Werner, 1964 i c g
 Anthicus basimacula Champion, 1890 i c g
 Anthicus basithorax Pic, 1941 g
 Anthicus bellulus LeConte, 1851 i c g
 Anthicus biguttatus La Ferté-Sénectère, 1849 g
 Anthicus biguttulus LeConte, 1851 i c g b
 Anthicus bimaculatus (Illiger, 1801) g
 Anthicus brunneipennis Pic, 1896 g
 Anthicus brunneus La Ferté-Sénectère, 1949 g
 Anthicus catalanus Bonadona, 1953 g
 Anthicus cervinus LaFerté-Sénectère, 1849 i c g b  (cloudy flower beetle)
 Anthicus comanche Werner, 1964 i c g
 Anthicus concinnus LaFerté, 1848 g
 Anthicus constellatus Krekich-Strassoldo, 1928 g
 Anthicus coracinus LeConte, 1852 i c g
 Anthicus cribratus LeConte, 1851 i c g
 Anthicus cribripennis Desbrochers des Loges, 1875 g
 Anthicus crinitus LaFerté-Sénectère, 1848 i c g
 Anthicus custodiae Werner, 1964 i c g
 Anthicus cylindricus Pic, 1899 g
 Anthicus czernohorskyi Pic, 1912 g
 Anthicus difformis De Marseul, 1879 g
 Anthicus dilaticollis Champion, 1890 i c g b
 Anthicus diversepunctatus Pic, 1913 g
 Anthicus diversus De Marseul, 1879 g
 Anthicus dravidiacus  g
 Anthicus ephippium LaFerté-Sénectère, 1849 i c g b
 Anthicus escorialensis Pic, 1893 g
 Anthicus falli Werner, 1964 i c g
 Anthicus fenestratus W.L.E.Schmidt, 1842 g
 Anthicus flavicans LeConte, 1852 i c g b
 Anthicus flavipes (Panzer, 1797) g
 Anthicus floralis (Linnaeus, 1758) – Narrownecked grain beetle
 Anthicus fumosus Lucas, 1843 g
 Anthicus fuscicornis La Ferté-Sénectère, 1849 g
 Anthicus genei La Ferté-Sénectère, 1849 g
 Anthicus gratiosus Pic, 1896 g
 Anthicus guttifer Wollaston, 1864 g
 Anthicus guyanensis Pic, 1904 g
 Anthicus haldemani LeConte, 1852 i c g b
 Anthicus hamicornis De Marseul, 1880 g
 Anthicus hastatus Casey, 1895 i c g b
 Anthicus heroicus Casey, 1895 i c g b
 Anthicus horridus LeConte, 1851 i c g
 Anthicus humeralis Gebler, 1841 g
 Anthicus ictericus LaFerté-Sénectère, 1849 i c g b
 Anthicus inaequalis Marseul, 1879 g
 Anthicus inderiensis De Marseul, 1879 g
 Anthicus insularis Werner, 1965 i c g
 Anthicus invreai Koch, 1933 g
 Anthicus korbi Pic, 1902 g
 Anthicus laeviceps Baudi di Selve, 1877 g
 Anthicus lapidosus Wollaston, 1864 g
 Anthicus latefasciatus Desbrochers des Loges, 1875 g
 Anthicus lecontei Champion, 1890 i c g b
 Anthicus leveillei Pic, 1893 g
 Anthicus lubbockii Wollaston, 1857 g
 Anthicus luteicornis Schmidt, 1842 g
 Anthicus lutulentus Casey, 1895 i c g b
 Anthicus macrocephalus Champion, 1890 i c g
 Anthicus maritimus LeConte, 1851 i c g b
 Anthicus melancholicus LaFerté-Sénectère, 1849 i c g b
 Anthicus militaris Casey, 1895 i c g
 Anthicus monsonicus  g
 Anthicus monstrosicornis Marseul, 1876 g
 Anthicus musculus Werner, 1975 i c g
 Anthicus nanus LeConte, 1851 i c g b
 Anthicus niger (Olivier, 1811) g
 Anthicus nigritus Mannerheim, 1853 i c g
 Anthicus obscurellus LeConte, 1851 i c g
 Anthicus oculatus Paykull, 1798 g
 Anthicus ophthalmicus Rottenberg, 1871 g
 Anthicus plectrinus Casey, 1904 i c g
 Anthicus pliginskyi (Telnov, 2004) g
 Anthicus praeceps Casey, 1895 i c g
 Anthicus proximus De Marseul, 1879 g
 Anthicus punctulatus LeConte, 1851 i c g b
 Anthicus quadridecoratus Abeille de Perrin, 1885 g
 Anthicus quadrilunatus LaFerté-Sénectère, 1849 i c g
 Anthicus quadrioculatus La Ferté-Sénectère, 1849 g
 Anthicus recens Werner, 1966 i c g
 Anthicus rufivestis Marseul, 1879 g
 Anthicus rufulus LeConte, 1852 i c g b
 Anthicus sabulosus De Marseul, 1879 g
 Anthicus sacramento Chandler, 1978 i c g – Sacramento beetle
 Anthicus sauteri Pic, 1913 g
 Anthicus scabriceps LeConte, 1850 i c g b
 Anthicus schmidtii Rosenhauer, 1847 g
 Anthicus scurrula Truqui, 1855 g
 Anthicus semicupreus Pic, 1893 g
 Anthicus sivaschensis Blinstein, 1988 g
 Anthicus sonoranus Werner, 1964 i c g
 Anthicus subtilis Gistel, 1831 g
 Anthicus theryi Pic, 1892 g
 Anthicus thomasi Pic, 1896 i c g
 Anthicus thyreocephalus Solsky, 1867 g
 Anthicus tristis Schmidt, 1842 g
 Anthicus troglodytes Boheman, 1858 g
 Anthicus umbrinus LaFerté-Sénectère, 1848 g
 Anthicus vexator Werner, 1965 i c g
 Anthicus virginiae (Casey, 1895) i c g

Data sources: i = ITIS, c = Catalogue of Life, g = GBIF, b = Bugguide.net

References

Anthicus